Charles Bixler Heiser Jr. (1920–2010) was a professor of botany, known as a leading expert on the sunflower genus Helianthus. He is also noteworthy as the author of a "series of popular books that did much to promote botany to the general public."

Biography
After graduating from Belleville Township High School, Illinois, where he was the senior class president, Heiser attended Washington University in St. Louis. There he was mentored by Robert Everard Woodson and Edgar Anderson and graduated with A.B. in 1943 and M.A. in 1944. In 1944 and the first part of 1945, Heiser was an instructor in the botany department at Washington University in St. Louis. In 1945 he began study for his Ph.D. at the University of California, Berkeley, where he worked with G. Ledyard Stebbins on the genetics of sunflowers, although Louis Mason was Heiser's official doctoral advisor. In 1947 Heiser received his Ph.D. and an edited version of his doctoral dissertation was published in the journal Evolution. For the academic year 1947–1948 he had a teaching position at the University of California, Davis. At Indiana University he was from 1947 to 1951 an assistant professor, from 1951 to 1957 an associate professor, from 1957 to 1979 a (full) professor, and from 1979 to 1986 a distinguished professor, retiring in 1986 as distinguished professor emeritus. He supervised 29 doctoral students and remained scientifically active in retirement, including at the Indiana University/Deam Herbarium.

In 1953, as a Guggenheim Fellow, he went on sabbatical leave in Costa Rica to study chili peppers and learn about the local flora. At the Instituto Interamericano de Cooperación para la Agricultura in Turrialba, Costa Rica, he met two students from Ecuador: Jorge Soria and Jaime Díaz. They were important in helping him on his two sabbatical years, 1962 and 1969, in Ecuador.

Heiser, working with Soria, developed a nematode-resistant hybrid between naranjilla cultivated in Ecuador and cocona cultivated in Amazonia. The hybrid became commercially significant and widely cultivated in Ecuador.

In 1944 Heiser married Dorothy Gaebler (1921–2015), who was a graduate student in the botany department of Washington University in St. Louis. Upon his death in 2010 he was survived by his widow, two daughters, a son, and seven grandchildren. In 1969 on a flight to Ecuador, Heiser, his wife, and two children were hijacked to Cuba.

Controversy over the origin of the domesticated sunflower
Heiser and several other ethnobotanists claimed that the domesticated sunflower originated in pre-Columbian North America and not in pre-Columbian Mexico. However, other experts have disputed the claim.

Awards and honors
 1967: President of the American Society of Plant Taxonomists
 1969: Gleason Award of the New York Botanical Garden
 1972: Merit Award of the Botanical Society of America
 1974: President of the Society for the Study of Evolution
 1978: President of the Society for Economic Botany
 1980: President of the Botanical Society of America
 1984: Distinguished Economic Botanist Award of the Society for Economic Botany
 1985: Pustovoit Award of the International Sunflower Association
 1987: Member of the United States National Academy of Sciences
 1988: Asa Gray Award of the American Society of Plant Taxonomists
 1996: Honorary member of the Instituto de Ciencias Naturales in Ecuador
 1997: Distinguished Scholar Award of the New York Botanical Garden
 2002: Raven Outreach Award of the American Society of Plant Taxonomists
 2004: Garden Globe Award for the book Weeds in my Garden (2003)
 2007: Centennial Award of the Botanical Society of America

Selected publications

Articles
 edward eugene Schilling, charles bixler Heiser. 1981. Infrageneric classification of Helianthus (Compositae). publ. International Bureau for Plant Taxonomy and Nomenclature. 11 pp.
 1980. Peppers of the Americas: at the National Arboretum. 9 pp.
 1961. Morphological and cytological variation in Helianthus petiolaris with notes on related species. publ. Society for the Study of Evolution. 12 pp.
 1951. The sunflower among the North American Indians. publ. American Philosophical Soc. 17 pp.
 1944. Monograph of psilostrophe. publ. Washington Univ.

Books
 2003. Weeds in my garden: observations on some misunderstood plants. publ. Timber Press. 247 pp.  online (not a guide to weed identification)
 1993. The Gourd Book. publ. University of Oklahoma Press. 248 pp.  online
 1992. Of Plants and People. publ. University of Oklahoma Press. 237 pp.  online
 1990. Seed to civilization: the story of food. publ. Harvard University Press. 228 pp. 
 1987. The fascinating world of the nightshades: tobacco, mandrake, potato, tomato, pepper, eggplant, etc. publ. Dover Publ. 200 pp. 
 1981. The Sunflower. publ. University of Oklahoma Press. 198 pp. 
 1969. Nightshades: the paradoxical plants. Series of books in biology. publ. W. H. Freeman. 200 pp. 
 1969. The North American sunflowers (Helianthus), Volume 22, Nº 3 Memoirs of the Torrey Botanical Club. publ. Club by the Seeman Printery. 218 pp.
 charles bixler Heiser, carl Sharsmith, kenton lee Chambers, roxana Stinchfield Ferris, john hunter Thomas, ira loren Wiggins, lawrence Beane. 1955. Notes on western North American sunflowers. Volume 4, Part 8 of Contributions from the Dudley Herbarium. 360 pp.
 1949. Study in the evolution of the sunflower species Helianthus annuus and H. bolanderi, Volume 23, Nº 4 University of California publications in botany. 52 pp.
 1947. Variability and hybridization in the sunflower species Helianthus annuus and H. bolanderi in California''. publ. University of California. 254 pp.

References

External links
 
 
  (online links to several articles by Charles B. Heiser Jr.)

1920 births
2010 deaths
20th-century American botanists
21st-century American botanists
Ethnobotanists
Plant collectors
Washington University in St. Louis alumni
University of California, Berkeley alumni
Indiana University faculty
Members of the United States National Academy of Sciences